Ishq Na Kariyo Koi is a 2018 Pakistani drama serial aired on Express Entertainment. The drama stars Noor Hassan Rizvi, Rabab Hashim and Hajra Yamin. The drama was first aired 10 October 2018.

Cast 
 Noor Hassan Rizvi as Faisal
 Rabab Hashim as Fariha
 Hajra Yamin as Maryam
 Humayoun Ashraf as Rehan
 Faria Sheikh as Rubab
 Saba Faisal as Faisal & Rehan's Mother
 Javed Sheikh as Faisal & Rehan's Father
 Firdous Jamal as Fariha's Father ‐ Fashion designer
 Naushaba Bashir as Seema
 Javed Jamal

References

External links 
Official website

2018 Pakistani television series debuts
Pakistani drama television series
2019 Pakistani television series endings
Urdu-language television shows